John Lewis Dodge (April 27, 1893June 19, 1916) was an American third baseman in Major League Baseball from 1912 until 1913. He made his debut on August 29, 1912 for the Philadelphia Phillies. He was traded to the Cincinnati Reds on June 3, 1913, and played his last game for the Reds on October 5 of that year.  He died in Mobile, Alabama after being hit in the head by a pitch in a minor league baseball game.

Fielding and Defense 
Dodge was a third baseman, but also played short stop and second base early in his career as a Philadelphia Phillie. After he was traded to the Cincinnati Reds for Beals Becker, Dodge played all of his games at third base. In 1913, Dodge was third in errors committed by a third baseman in the National League.

Death 
In early 1914, Dodge was released from the Reds, and by 1916 was playing with the Mobile Sea Gulls of the Southern League. On June 18, 1916, Dodge was hit square in the face by an inside pitch from Nashville's Tom Rogers. According to The Sporting News, "at the time it was not thought Dodge was seriously injured. Examination by physicians, however, showed that his face was crushed in such a manner that complications might result and he was taken to a hospital, but nothing medical aid could do would save his life." Dodge died the following night, at the age of 23. (Rogers would later make the majors, and in 1921 was briefly a teammate of Carl Mays, the pitcher
who had killed Ray Chapman the year before.)

See also
 List of baseball players who died during their careers

References

External links

1893 births
1916 deaths
Baseball players from Mississippi
Burials at Cave Hill Cemetery
Cincinnati Reds players
Major League Baseball third basemen
Philadelphia Phillies players
Sports deaths in Alabama
Newport Pearl Diggers players
Norfolk Tars players
Louisville Colonels (minor league) players
Nashville Vols players
Mobile Sea Gulls players
Baseball deaths